Vexitomina coxi, common name Cox's turrid, is a species of sea snail, a marine gastropod mollusk in the family Horaiclavidae.

Description
The length of the shell attains 33 mm.

Distribution
This marine species is endemic to Australia and occurs off New South Wales, Queensland, Tasmania and Victoria

References

 Angas, G.F. 1867. Descriptions of thirty-two new species of marine shells from the coast of New South Wales. Proceedings of the Zoological Society of London 1867: 110–117, pl. 13
 Tenison-Woods, J.E. 1879. On some new Tasmanian marine shells. Proceedings of the Royal Society of Tasmania 1878: 32-40 
 Pritchard, G.B. & Gatliff, J.H. 1906. Catalogue of the Marine Shells of Victoria. Part IX. With complete index to the whole Catalogue. Proceedings of the Royal Society of Victoria 18(2): 39-92
  Hedley, C. 1922. A revision of the Australian Turridae. Records of the Australian Museum 13(6): 213-359, pls 42-56
 May, W.L. 1923. An Illustrated Index of Tasmanian Shells: with 47 plates and 1052 species. Hobart : Government Printer 100 pp.
 Allan, J.K. 1950. Australian Shells: with related animals living in the sea, in freshwater and on the land. Melbourne : Georgian House xix, 470 pp., 45 pls, 112 text figs.
 Laseron, C. 1954. Revision of the New South Wales Turridae (Mollusca). Australian Zoological Handbook. Sydney : Royal Zoological Society of New South Wales 1-56, pls 1-12. 
 Powell, A.W.B. 1969. The family Turridae in the Indo-Pacific. Part. 2. The subfamily Turriculinae. Indo-Pacific Mollusca 2(10): 207–415, pls 188-324
 Wilson, B. 1994. Australian Marine Shells. Prosobranch Gastropods. Kallaroo, WA : Odyssey Publishing Vol. 2 370 pp.

External links
 
  Tucker, J.K. 2004 Catalog of recent and fossil turrids (Mollusca: Gastropoda). Zootaxa 682:1-1295

coxi
Gastropods of Australia